McAlpine Mountain is a summit in Henderson County, North Carolina, in the United States.

The peak was named for Henry McAlpin, an early settler.

References

Mountains of Henderson County, North Carolina
Mountains of North Carolina